Robert Steward may refer to:

Robert Steward (dean) (died 1557), English Benedictine prior of Ely, and first dean of Ely
Robert Steward (MP) (1617–1672), English politician
Robert the Steward
Robert Steward (diplomat), on List of ambassadors of the United Kingdom to Colombia

See also
Robert Stewart (disambiguation)